North Philipsburg is an unincorporated community and census-designated place (CDP) in Centre County, Pennsylvania, United States. It is part of the State College, Pennsylvania Metropolitan Statistical Area. The population was 660 at the 2010 census.

Geography
North Philipsburg is located in western Centre County at  (40.907342, -78.208782), in Rush Township. It is bordered to the southwest by the borough of Philipsburg and to the northwest by Moshannon Creek, the boundary with Clearfield County. The creek is a northward-flowing tributary of the West Branch Susquehanna River.

U.S. Route 322 runs through Philipsburg, just south of the North Philipsburg boundary, leading southeast  to Interstate 99 at Port Matilda and northwest  to Clearfield. PA 504 runs east from North Philipsburg  to Black Moshannon State Park.

Demographics

As of the census of 2010, there were 660 people, 263 households, and 140 families residing in the CDP. The population density was 899.7 people per square mile (347.4/km). There were 286 housing units at an average density of 389.9/sq mi (149.2/km). The racial makeup of the CDP was 98.2% White, 0.1% Native American, 0.2% Asian, 0.6% other, and 0.9% from two or more races. Hispanic or Latino of any race were 0.5% of the population.

There were 263 households, out of which 21.3% had children under the age of 18 living with them, 40.7% were married couples living together, 5.3% had a male householder with no wife present, 7.2% had a female householder with no husband present, and 46.8% were non-families. 41.4% of all households were made up of individuals, and 23.2% had someone living alone who was 65 years of age or older. The average household size was 2.10 and the average family size was 2.88.

In the CDP, the population was spread out, with 14.2% under the age of 18, 6.8% from 18 to 24, 21.4% from 25 to 44, 22.1% from 45 to 64, and 35.5% who were 65 years of age or older. The median age was 52 years. For every 100 females, there were 76.9 males. For every 100 females age 18 and over, there were 76.3 males.

The median income for a household in the CDP was $36,598, and the median income for a family was $37,257.  The per capita income for the CDP was $16,432. About 3.8% of families and 10.5% of the population were below the poverty line, including 5.9% of those age 65 or over.

References

Census-designated places in Centre County, Pennsylvania
Census-designated places in Pennsylvania